James D. McGinnis  (January 11, 1932 – February 24, 2009) was an American real estate agent and politician from Dover in Kent County, Delaware. He was a member of the Democratic Party, who served as Delaware's 19th lieutenant governor.

Professional career
McGinnis was born in Chicago, Illinois, and moved to Dover, Delaware, in 1954. In 1964 he entered the real estate business by selling and leasing commercial property. He worked in the industry for eleven years before earning his Broker's license from the Delaware Real Estate Commission in 1975. McGinnis earned a Certified Commercial Investment Member (CCIM) designation from the National Association of Realtors and is a member of the Kent County Association of Realtors, Delaware Association of Realtors, and National Association of Realtors. From 1990 to 1992, he served on the Landlord-Tenant Committee for the Kent County Realtors Association.

Political career
McGinnis first won elected office in 1962, when he was elected to the Delaware House of Representatives.  In 1964, after only one term in the House, McGinnis won election to the State Senate, holding his seat until 1966.

Upon the retirement of Democratic State Representative Ralph R. Smith in 1972, McGinnis returned to the State House by winning Smith's seat in Delaware's 32nd Representative district.  He was reelected in 1974 and served as Majority Leader from 1975 to 1976.

McGinnis's legislative prowess led Delaware Democrats to nominate him for Lieutenant Governor.  The Democratic candidate for Governor was incumbent Sherman W. Tribbitt, running for reelection amid a financial crisis.  Then U.S. Congressman and du Pont family heir Pierre S. du Pont, IV defeated Tribbitt for Governor by a 15-point margin.  Despite this overwhelming defeat by the Democratic gubernatorial candidate, McGinnis won his race for Lieutenant Governor, defeating Republican Andrew Foltz by a slim one and a half point margin.

In 1980 McGinnis declined to run for reelection as Lieutenant Governor, instead opting to run for Governor.  However, he and most of the other Democratic contenders dropped out of the primary in favor of eventual nominee William J. Gordy. Gordy lost to incumbent Governor du Pont. The Democratic candidate for Lieutenant Governor was State Senate Majority Leader and future President Pro Tempore Thomas B. Sharp, who lost the election to future Governor Michael N. Castle by 19%.

In March 1997 Democratic Governor Thomas R. Carper recognized McGinnis's combined experience in the areas of politics and real estate by appointing him to a three-year term on the Delaware Real Estate Commission.  He has been reappointed since then by Carper and his successor, Ruth Ann Minner.  Minner and McGinnis had served together in the State House from 1975 to 1977, when McGinnis was the floor leader for their caucus and Minner was in her first term.

Almanac
Elections are held the first Tuesday after November 1. Members of the Delaware General Assembly take office the second Tuesday of January. The Lt. Governor takes office the third Tuesday of January.

External links
Delaware Election Results 
Gubernatorial Appointments 
McGinnis Realty

Places with more information
Delaware Historical Society; website; 505 North Market Street, Wilmington, Delaware 19801; (302) 655-7161
University of Delaware; Library website; 181 South College Avenue, Newark, Delaware 19717; (302) 831-2965

1932 births
2009 deaths
Politicians from Chicago
People from Dover, Delaware
Businesspeople from Delaware
Democratic Party members of the Delaware House of Representatives
Democratic Party Delaware state senators
Lieutenant Governors of Delaware
Burials in Kent County, Delaware
20th-century American politicians
20th-century American businesspeople